The Dutch Eredivisie in the 1994–95 season was contested by 18 teams. Ajax won the championship. Starting this season, clubs qualifying for the Intertoto Cup can play for a spot in the UEFA Cup.

League table

Results

Promotion/relegation play-offs
In the promotion/relegation competition, eight entrants (six from the Eerste Divisie and two from this league) entered in two groups. The group winners were promoted to (or remained in) the Eredivisie.

See also
 1994–95 Eerste Divisie
 1994–95 KNVB Cup

References
Notes

Sources
 Eredivisie official website - info on all seasons 
 RSSSF

Eredivisie seasons
Netherlands
1994–95 in Dutch football